The National Archives of Guinea were established in the 1960s after the country gained its independence. They have been moved three times since then and are currently situated in the capital city of Conakry.  As of around 1995, the archives had a collection of over 3,000 volumes.

See also
List of national archives
List of buildings and structures in Guinea
National Library of Guinea

References

Guinea
Buildings and structures in Conakry
Museums established in 1960